Nikolai Yegorovich Sverchkov (1817–1898) was a Russian painter who specialized in genre and hunting scenes with horses. He was also a member of the Imperial Academy of Arts.

Biography 
His father was an Imperial groom and coachman. As a child, he worked with his father and began drawing animals. Impressed with his work, his parents arranged for him to take lessons at the Imperial Academy of Arts with the battle painter, Alexander Sauerweid, from 1827 to 1829. Unable to keep up with the rigorous program there, he was transferred to the prestigious Saint Peter's School, where he studied from 1829 to 1833. Upon graduating, he found employment with the Ministry of the Interior.

He painted in his free time and showed his works at the annual exhibitions of the Academy. In 1839, he was awarded the title of "Free Artist" and quit the civil service. During the 1840s, he visited several famous stud farms to paint scenes of the horses there. In 1850, these were published in book form by the Velten company in Karlsruhe.

Following that, he visited Nikolai Nekrasov at his estate near Yaroslavl and created illustrations for some of his works. In 1852, he was named an "Academician" for his popular troika paintings, and became a Professor in 1855.

From 1856 to 1864, he lived abroad; first in Paris, where he exhibited at the Salon, then in London and Brussels. In 1863, his painting of a bear hunt was purchased by Emperor Napoleon III.

Upon returning to Saint Petersburg in 1864, he was commissioned by Tsar Alexander II to paint a large canvas depicting the departure of Tsar Alexis I to inspect his troops in 1664. He would continue to receive orders from the Royal Court until 1882. Most of this work involved equestrian portraits of members of the Royal Family, but he also did battle scenes; especially from the Russo-Turkish War.

He continued to exhibit frequently, participating in many international shows, including the Centennial Exposition in Philadelphia. In all, he produced 350 paintings and over a thousand drawings.

Works

References

External links 

ArtNet: More works by Sverchkov.

19th-century painters from the Russian Empire
Russian male painters
1817 births
1898 deaths
Painters from Saint Petersburg
Russian genre painters
Animal paintings
Equestrian portraits
Russian illustrators
19th-century male artists from the Russian Empire